is a Japanese actor.

Career
Kashiwabara starred in Yoshihiko Matsui's 2008 film Where Are We Going? He has also appeared in films such as A Day on the Planet and Alien vs Ninja.

Filmography

Films
 'Hood (1998)
 Desert Moon (2001)
 Off-Balance (2001)
 Seventh Anniversary (2003)
 A Day on the Planet (2004)
 Overdrive (2004)
 Blood and Bones (2004)
 Who's Camus Anyway? (2006)
 Nihon Igai Zenbu Chinbotsu (2006)
 Thank You (2006)
 Vacation (2008)
 Where Are We Going? (2008)
 The Code (2009)
 Sengoku: Iga no Ran (2009)
 Alien vs Ninja (2010)
 I Am (2010)
 Rock (2011)
 Close-Knit (2017)
 Naminori Office e Yōkoso (2019)
 Walking Man (2019)
 Nobutora 1573 (2020), Yanagisawa Yoshiyasu
 The Setting Sun (2022)

Television
 Teppan (2010–2011)
 Asa ga Kita (2015–2016), as Ōkubo Toshimichi
 Segodon (2018), as Matsudaira Katamori

References

External links
 
 

1978 births
Living people
Japanese male actors
Actors from Yamanashi Prefecture